State Route 143 (SR 143) is a  north–south state highway in the central part of the U.S. state of Alabama, extending north from Interstate 65 (I-65) and U.S. Route 82 (US 82) northwest of Montgomery to US 31 near Clanton. It parallels I-65, traveling through Millbrook, Elmore, and Deatsville.

Route description

History
Prior to the 1957 renumbering, SR 143 was numbered State Route 45; it was renumbered because of US 45.

Prior to the construction of I-65, SR 143 crossed the Alabama River on the Tyler–Goodwyn Bridge and entered Montgomery on Parallel Street. The bridge, scene of the murder of Willie Edwards, was subsequently removed.

Major intersections

See also

References

143
State Route 143
State Route 143
State Route 143
State Route 143